KREW is a lifestyle brand that was cofounded by Angel Cabada in 2002. KREW is owned by ACX, Inc, a company based in Hollywood, Los Angeles. 

Cabada is also the Founder of STRAYE, SUPRA and was previously a partner in TSA Clothing, another skateboard apparel company, but left shortly before its demise.

References

External links
 KREW website

Clothing companies of the United States
Skateboarding companies
Clothing companies established in 2002
Companies based in Orange County, California
Fountain Valley, California
2002 establishments in California